The Ministry of Rural Development and Lands is a Bolivian government ministry in charge of rural development. The current minister is Edwin Ronald Characayo. The Ministry has three two child agencies: Agricultural Development and Coca and Integral Development.

See also 
 Cabinet of Bolivia

References

External links 
  

Government ministries of Bolivia